Bates Dairy is a large dairy based in Southport, Merseyside. It has been delivering milk to homes since 1939.

Bates Dairy is one of the largest independent dairies in Britain. Bates has over twenty electric milk floats, most of them built by Ross in 1970s and 1980s. Bates also own a specially converted Morrison Marsden Milk Float with many different compartments for the heavy duty Southport centre.

In April 2014, Bates upgraded most of its equipment, making it one of the most hygienic dairies in Merseyside. The company employs over 90 staff in a variety of roles including delivery, sales, administration and processing staff. One of its biggest customers is TJ Morris Ltd, who own the Home Bargains chain of discount stores.

References

External links
Bates Dairy

Dairy products companies of the United Kingdom